KMFM (100.7 FM) was a radio station licensed to Premont, Texas, United States. The station was last owned by Paulino Bernal. Bernal surrendered the license for KMFM and five other stations to the Federal Communications Commission on November 7, 2013.

References

External links
 

MFM
Radio stations established in 1963
1963 establishments in Texas
Defunct radio stations in the United States
Radio stations disestablished in 2013
Defunct religious radio stations in the United States
2013 disestablishments in Texas
MFM